Horst Janson (born 4 October 1935) is a German actor.

Career
Horst Janson's career started with the film The Buddenbrooks in 1959. He also featured in Helmut Käutner’s A Glass of Water (Das Glas Wasser, 1960).

Among his English-language films are the Hammer Film production Captain Kronos - Vampire Hunter (1974) and Murphy's War (1971, with Peter O'Toole and Philippe Noiret). He has appeared in many other feature films, including spaghetti westerns with Franco Nero, Eli Wallach and other international productions with Roger Moore, Tony Curtis, Anthony Perkins, Charles Bronson and Robert Wagner.

On television, Janson appeared on the show Der Bastian (1973). Janson has appeared in numerous other works for both film and television. Some of the TV series he worked on were: Salto Mortale (1969–1971), Sesamstraße (the German version of Sesame Street, 1980–1983), Zwei Halbe sind noch lange kein Ganzes (1993), Zwei Schlitzohren in Antalya (1991–1994).

He also appeared in many German, French, Spanish, Italian, and English-language TV movies including Höllenfahrten (Hell Ride, 1998), Der Bunker (1992), Rose et Marguerite (1997), Il segno della scimmia (The Sign of the Ape, 1997), Liebe, Tod und viele Kalorien (2001) and Freundinnen fűr Immer (2003).

He played Captain Bernd Jensen in the ARD series Unter weißen Segeln (In White Sails).

Filmography

Film
His film appearances include:

 The Buddenbrooks (1959, part 1), as Morten Schwarzkopf
  (1960), as Fred
 A Glass of Water (1960), as Arthur Masham
  (1960), as Jürgen Lüdecke
 Das Riesenrad (1961), as Harry
 The Cry of the Wild Geese (1961), as Sven Sandbo
 Das Mädchen und der Staatsanwalt (1962), as Thomas Ungermann
 Escape from East Berlin (1962), as Günther Jurgens
 Le glaive et la balance (1963)
 Teufelskreise (1963, TV film), as David Mannion
 Liebe auf den zweiten Blick (1964, TV film)
 Auf halbem Weg zum Paradies (1965, TV film), as Peter Shean
 Niemandsland (1965, TV film), as Smithson
 Der Spielverderber – Das kurze, verstörte Leben des Kaspar Hauser (1965, TV film), as Junger Herr
 Anatomie eines Unfalls (1965, TV film), as Fred Kirch
 End of Conflict (Fall erledigt, 1965, TV film), as Corporal Stacey
 Großer Ring mit Außenschleife (1966, TV film), as Leo Knauf
 Das Rätsel von Foresthouse (1966, TV film), as Flint
 Die Liebenden von Florenz (1966, TV film), as Martin
 Erinnerung an zwei Montage (1966, TV film), as Kenneth
 Brille und Bombe – Bei uns liegen Sie richtig! (1967)
 Die Letzten (1967, TV film), as Jakorjew
  (1969), as George
  (1969), as Alfred
  (1969), as Rainer Forst
 You Can't Win 'Em All (1970), as Wollen
 The McKenzie Break (1970), as Lt. Neuchl
 Murphy's War (1971), as Lauchs
  (1971), as Helmut
 The Captain (1971), as Jörg Neher
 Long Live Your Death (1971), as Yuma Sheriff Randall
 Life Is Tough, Eh Providence? (1972), as Sheriff Villaggio
 Der Ehefeind (1972)
 Crazy - Completely Mad (1973), as Alex Ross
  (Zinksärge für die Goldjungen, 1973), as Erik
 No Gold for a Dead Diver (1974), as Hans Faerber
 Captain Kronos – Vampire Hunter (1974), as Kronos
 Spring in Immenhof (1974), as Alexander Arkens
 The Twins from Immenhof (1974), as Alexander Arkens
 Shout at the Devil (1976), as Kyller
 Taxi 4012 (1976, TV film), as Stefan Kamensky
 The Best of Enemies (1977, TV film)
 Breakthrough (1979), as Capt. Berger
  (1983), as Jack
 Das Nürnberger Bett (1983)
 To Catch a King (1984, TV film), as General Schellenberg
  (1984), as Martin Forster
 The Last Days of Patton (1986, TV film), as Baron von Wangenheim
 Veterinarian Christine (1993, TV film), as Thomas Nemes
 Vukovar: The Way Home (1994), as Klaun
 Veterinarian Christine II: The Temptation (1995, TV film), as Thomas Nemes
 ...dann hau ich eben ab (1995, TV film), as Konsinski
 Il segno della scimmia (1997, TV film), as Professor Simak
 Les mystères de Sadjurah (1997, TV film), as Schwartz
 The Last Bomb (Der Bunker – Eine todsichere Falle, 1999, TV film), as General Kilian
 Liebe, Tod & viele Kalorien (2001, TV film), as Kurt Markmann
 Freundinnen für immer (2003, TV film), as Fred Jakob
 Mein Mann, mein Leben und Du (2003, TV film), as Abt Antonius
  (2005), as Dr. Schneider
 Comedy-Schiff (2005, TV film)
 Da wo es noch Treue gibt (2006, TV film)
 Momella – Eine Farm in Afrika (2007, TV film), as Graf Rantzau
 SEK Calw (2007)
 Winnetou und das Geheimnis der Geisterschlucht (direct-to-video, 2007), as Narrator
 Dunkelrot (2008, Short), as Erich Krahl
 Totgesagte leben länger (direct-to-video, 2008), as Gangster Boss
 Familie ist was Wunderbares (2008, TV film), as Paul Hieronymus
  (2009, TV film), as Herr Sagmeister
  (2009, TV film), as Pfarrer
 Eines Tages... (2010), as Jakob Filzmeyer
 The Broken Crown (2010)
 Flaschendrehen (2011, TV film), as Hansen Senior
  (2012, TV film)
 Destruction of Silence (2013, Short), as Philipp Schmidt (old)
 La corona spezzata (2014), as Detective Gruber

Television
His TV series, miniseries & shorts appearances include:

 Sie schreiben mit (1960)
 Das Kriminalmuseum (1 episode, 1967), as Peter Schmelz
 ITV Play of the Week (1 episode, 1967), as Franz Muller
 Landarzt Dr. Brock (3 episodes, 1967), as Michael Rühling
 The Root of All Evil? (1 episode, 1968), as Max Huber
 Sein Traum vom Grand Prix (6 episodes, 1967), as Jochen Renk
 Gestern gelesen (1969)
 Salto mortale (18 episodes, 1969–1971), as Sascha Doria
 Seasons of the Year (1 episode, 1971), as Otto Huber
 Upstairs, Downstairs (1 episode, A Suitable Marriage, 1971), as Baron Klaus von Rimmer
 George (1 episode, 1972), as Max Steiger Jr.
 Eine Frau bleibt eine Frau (2 episodes, 1972–1973), as Wolfgang Brettschneider / Jochen Brettschneider
 Der Bastian (13 episodes, 1973), as Bastian Guthmann
 Die Abwerbung (1974, TV Short)
 Hamburg Transit (1 episode, 1974), as Horst Schanzer
  (1 episode, 1974), as Allan
 Graf Yoster gibt sich die Ehre (1 episode, 1974), as Peter Mangold
  (5 episodes, 1974–1975), as Piet van Straaten
 ITV Sunday Night Drama (1 episode, 1976), as Paul
  (aka Diamantensucher) (1 episode, 1978)
 Die Protokolle des Herrn M (13 episodes, 1979), as Jürgen Textor
 Sesamstraße (more than 200 episodes, 1980–1983)
 Smuggler (2 episodes, 1981), as Sir Paul Fisher
 Sonderdezernat K1 (5 episodes, 1981–1982), as Kriminalmeister Robert Hahn
 Kontakt bitte... (1 episode, 1983)
 Kommissariat 9 (1 episode, 1983), as Frank Howard
 Unsere schönsten Jahre (1 episode, 1983), as Stefan Fuchs
 Giovanni, da una madre all'altra (3 episodes, 1983)
 Ein Fall für TKKG (1 episode, 1987), as Herr Lattmann
 Dirty Dozen: The Series (1 episode, 1988), as Karl Jensen
 Die Nordlichter (12 episodes, 1988)
 Forstinspektor Buchholz (1 episode, 1988), as Dr. Elbing
 Forsthaus Falkenau (3 episodes, 1989–1991), as Herr Vellberg
 Der Landarzt (5 episodes, 1989–1996), as Jesper Jensen / Felix Spöri
  (2 episodes, 1989), as Harlinger
 Zwei Schlitzohren in Antalya (20 episodes, 1991–1994), as Thomas Parler
 Geschichten aus dem Leben (1 episode, 1993)
 Ein Schloß am Wörthersee (2 episodes, 1993), as Fredy Dunka
 Zwei Halbe sind noch lange kein Ganzes (13 episodes, 1993), as Friedhelm Danner
 Rosamunde Pilcher (1 episode, 1993), as Otto Peddersen
 Großstadtrevier (2 episodes, 1993–2015), as Schumacher
 Ein unvergeßliches Wochenende (1 episode, 1994), as Niko
 Wildbach (1 episode, 1994), as Benno Kowalczyk
 Ein Fall für zwei (1 episode, 1995)
 Hallo, Onkel Doc! (1 episode, 1996), as Herr Steffens
 Singles (1 episode, 1997), as Siegfried
 Küstenwache (2 episodes, 1997–2006), as Manfred Kulick / Peter de Waal
 Sylvia – Eine Klasse für sich (1 episode, 1998), as Nikolas Vater
 CityExpress (1 episode, 1999), as Toni Morvetz
 Die Strandclique (1 episode, 1999), as Edgar Kimling
 Die Wache (1 episode, 2001), as Viktor Frombach
 Ein unmöglicher Mann (1 episode, 2001), as Dr. Müller
 Alle meine Töchter (8 episodes, 2001), as Dr. Prestel
 In aller Freundschaft (2 episodes, 2003–2010), as Robert Borger / Dr. Ingo Petersen
 Unter weißen Segeln (4 episodes, 2005–2006), as Bernd Jensen
 Inga Lindström (1 episode, 2005), as Tore Hasselrot
 Das Traumhotel (1 episode, 2006), as Robert Kaufmann
 Die Rosenheim-Cops (1 episode, 2006), as Dr. Daxenberger
 Die Spezialisten: Kripo Rhein-Main (1 episode, 2006), as Albert Junghans
 Cologne P.D. (1 episode, 2007), as Heinrich König
 SOKO 5113 (2 episodes, 2006–2017), as Wolfgang Mahler / Dr. Jan Rudolph / Konrad von Senggen
 Die ProSieben Märchenstunde (1 episode, 2007), as König Berthold
 Julia – Wege zum Glück (2 episodes, 2008), as Pfarrer Paul Lehmann
 Unser Mann im Süden (1 episode, 2008), as Otto Vogel
 Um Himmels Willen (6 episodes, 2008–2009), as Fritz Rickenbacher
 Sturm der Liebe (4 episodes, 2008–2009), as Dr. Paul Wielander
 Countdown - Die Jagd beginnt (1 episode, 2012), as Kuhn
 Der letzte Bulle (1 episode, 2012), as Hannes Kampeter
 Die Pfefferkörner (1 episode, 2013), as Hans von der Hagen
 Tatort (1 episode, 2013), as von Meeren
 Familie Dr. Kleist (1 episode, 2013), as Friedrich Mattes

References

External links
 
 

German male film actors
German male television actors
20th-century German male actors
21st-century German male actors
Living people
People from Wiesbaden
People from Hesse-Nassau
Male Spaghetti Western actors
1935 births